Gentili is an Italian surname. Notable people with the surname include:

 Alberico Gentili (1552–1608), Italian jurist
 Aloysius Gentili (1801–1848), Italian Rosminian cleric
 Andreina Gentili, best known as Andreina Pagnani (1906–1981), Italian actress and voice actress
 Antonio Pallavicini Gentili (1441–1507), Italian Cardinal
 Camilla Gentili (???-1486), Italian Roman Catholic 
 Danilo Gentili (born 1979), Brazilian comedian, television host, writer, cartoonist, and businessman
 Eugenio Gentili Tedeschi, Italian architect, designer, teacher and writer
 Giacomo Gentili (born 1997), Italian rower
 Luca Gentili (footballer born 1972), former Italian footballer
 Luca Gentili (footballer born 1986), Italian footballer
 Manuela Gentili (born 1978), Italian hurdler
 Mario Gentili (cyclist, born 1913) (1913–1999), Italian cyclist
 Mario Gentili (cyclist, born 1962), retired Italian amateur cyclist
 Massimiliano Gentili (born 1971), former Italian cyclist
 Scipione Gentili (1563–1616), Italian law professor and a legal writer
 Sebastiano Gentili (1597–1667), Italian Roman Catholic prelate
 Serafino Gentili (1775–1835), Italian opera singer

See also
 Gentile (surname)

Italian-language surnames